Moratorium (Broadcasts from the Interruption) is a compilation album by British rock band Enter Shikari, released on 16 April 2021. Recorded throughout the COVID-19 pandemic, the album consists of remote live and acoustic performances recorded while the band members were separated from one another due to lockdown measures.

Background and release
On 17 April 2020, the band released their sixth studio album Nothing Is True & Everything Is Possible, with the intention of touring it later that year. However, due to the COVID-19 pandemic, tour plans were cancelled due to lockdown measures and ultimately rescheduled to take place at the end of 2021. Under lockdown, the band began trying to work out different ways of performing while they were all locked down away from each other, with lead singer Rou Reynolds stating that “with no live shows, and no real contact with the rest of the band, it was nice to at least be able to do some remote sessions together. It was also interesting to develop acoustic and alternative versions of some of the new tracks. These performances went some way to filling the gaping hole in our lives!”

The album was released on 16 April 2021, accompanied by a book penned by Reynolds titled A Treatise On Possibility: Perspectives On Humanity Hereafter.

Track list

Tracks 5 and 11 are exclusive to the digital edition, and are missing from physical releases (CD and vinyl).

Personnel
Enter Shikari
 Rou Reynolds – vocals, guitar, production
 Rory Clewlow – guitar, backing vocals
 Chris Batten – bass, synthesizer, vocals
 Rob Rolfe – drums, backing vocals

Additional musicians
 Sofia Session Orchestra

Charts

References

2021 albums
Enter Shikari albums
Compilation albums by English artists
Live albums by English artists